

Events

Pre-1600
33 – Heartbroken by the deaths of her sons Nero and Drusus, and banished to the island of Pandateria by Tiberius, Agrippina the Elder dies of self-inflicted starvation. 
 320 – Pappus of Alexandria, Greek philosopher, observes an eclipse of the Sun and writes a commentary on The Great Astronomer (Almagest).
 614 – King Chlothar II promulgates the Edict of Paris (Edictum Chlotacharii), a sort of Frankish Magna Carta that defends the rights of the Frankish nobles while it excludes Jews from all civil employment in the Frankish Kingdom.
 629 – Dagobert I is crowned King of the Franks.
1009 – The Church of the Holy Sepulchre, a Christian church in Jerusalem, is completely destroyed by the Fatimid caliph Al-Hakim bi-Amr Allah, who hacks the Church's foundations down to bedrock.
1016 – The Danes defeat the English in the Battle of Assandun.
1081 – The Normans defeat the Byzantine Empire in the Battle of Dyrrhachium.
1281 – Pope Martin IV excommunicates King Peter III of Aragon for usurping the crown of Sicily (a sentence renewed on 7 May and 18 November 1282).
1356 – Basel earthquake, the most significant historic seismological event north of the Alps, destroys the town of Basel, Switzerland.
1540 – Spanish conquistador Hernando de Soto's forces destroy the fortified town of Mabila in present-day Alabama, killing Tuskaloosa.
1561 – In Japan the fourth Battle of Kawanakajima is fought between the forces of Uesugi Kenshin and Takeda Shingen, resulting in a draw.
1565 – Ships belonging to the Matsura clan of Japan fail to capture the Portuguese trading carrack in the Battle of Fukuda Bay, the first recorded naval battle between Japan and the West.
1597 – King Philip II of Spain send his third and final armada against England, but ends in failure due to storms. The remaining ships are captured or sunk by the English.
1599 – Michael the Brave, Prince of Wallachia, defeats the Army of Andrew Báthory in the Battle of Șelimbăr, leading to the first recorded unification of the Romanian people.

1601–1900
1630 – Frendraught Castle in Scotland, the home of James Crichton of Frendraught, burns down.
1648 – Boston shoemakers form the first American labor organization.
1748 – Signing of the Treaty of Aix-la-Chapelle ends the War of the Austrian Succession.
1775 – African-American poet Phillis Wheatley is freed from slavery.
  1775   – American Revolutionary War: The Burning of Falmouth (now Portland, Maine).
1779 – American Revolutionary War: The Franco-American Siege of Savannah is lifted.
1797 – Treaty of Campo Formio is signed between France and Austria
1851 – Herman Melville's Moby-Dick is first published as The Whale by Richard Bentley of London.
1860 – The Second Opium War finally ends at the Convention of Peking with the ratification of the Treaty of Tientsin, an unequal treaty.
1867 – United States takes possession of Alaska after purchasing it from Russia for $7.2 million. Celebrated annually in the state as Alaska Day.
1898 – The United States takes possession of Puerto Rico from Spain.
1900 – Count Bernhard von Bülow becomes chancellor of Germany.

1901–present
1912 – First Balkan War: King Peter I of Serbia issues a declaration "To the Serbian People", as his country joins the war.
1914 – The Schoenstatt Apostolic Movement is founded in Germany.
1921 – The Crimean Autonomous Soviet Socialist Republic is formed as part of the Russian Soviet Federative Socialist Republic.
1922 – The British Broadcasting Company (later Corporation)  is founded by a consortium, to establish a nationwide network of radio transmitters to provide a national broadcasting service.
1929 – The Judicial Committee of the Privy Council overrules the Supreme Court of Canada in Edwards v. Canada when it declares that women are considered "Persons" under Canadian law.
1944 – World War II: Soviet Union begins the liberation of Czechoslovakia from Nazi Germany.
  1944   – World War II: The state funeral of Field Marshal Erwin Rommel takes place in Ulm, Germany.
1945 – The USSR's nuclear program receives plans for the United States plutonium bomb from Klaus Fuchs at the Los Alamos National Laboratory.
  1945   – A group of the Venezuelan Armed Forces, led by Mario Vargas, Marcos Pérez Jiménez and Carlos Delgado Chalbaud, stages a coup d'état against president Isaías Medina Angarita, who is overthrown by the end of the day.
  1945   – Argentine military officer and politician Juan Perón marries actress Eva Duarte.
1954 – Texas Instruments announces the first transistor radio.
1963 – Félicette, a black and white female Parisian stray cat, becomes the first cat launched into space.
1967 – The Soviet probe Venera 4 reaches Venus and becomes the first spacecraft to measure the atmosphere of another planet.
1977 – German Autumn: A set of events revolving around the kidnapping of Hanns Martin Schleyer and the hijacking of a Lufthansa flight by the Red Army Faction (RAF) comes to an end when Schleyer is murdered and various RAF members allegedly commit suicide.
1979 – The Federal Communications Commission (FCC) begins allowing people to have home satellite earth stations without a federal government license.
1991 – The Supreme Council of Azerbaijan adopts a declaration of independence from the Soviet Union.
1992 – Merpati Nustantara Airlines Flight 5601 crashes into Mount Papandayan near the town of Garut in West Java, Indonesia, killing 31.
2003 – Bolivian gas conflict: Bolivian President Gonzalo Sánchez de Lozada is forced to resign and leave Bolivia.
2007 – Karachi bombing: A suicide attack on a motorcade carrying former Pakistani Prime Minister Benazir Bhutto kills 139 and wounds 450 more. Bhutto herself is uninjured.
2019 – NASA Astronauts Jessica Meir and Christina Koch take part in the first all-female spacewalk when they venture out of the International Space Station to replace a power controller.
  2019   – Riots in Chile's capital Santiago escalate into open battles, with attacks reported at nearly all of the city's 164 Metro stations. President Sebastián Piñera later announces a 15-day state of emergency in the capital.

Births

Pre-1600
1127 – Emperor Go-Shirakawa of Japan (d. 1192)
1130 – Zhu Xi, Chinese philosopher (d. 1200)
1405 – Pope Pius II (d. 1464)
1444 – John de Mowbray, 4th Duke of Norfolk (d. 1476)
1482 – Philipp III, Count of Hanau-Lichtenberg (d. 1538)
1517 – Manuel da Nóbrega, Portuguese-Brazilian priest and missionary (d. 1570)
1523 – Anna Jagiellon, daughter of Sigismund I of Poland (d. 1596)
1536 – William Lambarde, English antiquarian and politician (d. 1601)
1547 – Justus Lipsius, Belgian philologist and scholar (d. 1606)
1553 – Luca Marenzio, Italian composer (d. 1599)
1569 – Giambattista Marino, Italian poet (d. 1625)
1587 – Lady Mary Wroth, English poet (d. 1651)
1595 – Edward Winslow, American Pilgrim leader (d. 1655)

1601–1900
1616 – Nicholas Culpeper, English botanist (d. 1654)
1630 – Henry Powle, English politician (d. 1692)
1634 – Luca Giordano, Italian painter and illustrator (d. 1705)
1653 – Abraham van Riebeeck, South African-Dutch merchant and politician, Governor-General of the Dutch East Indies (d. 1713)
1662 – Matthew Henry, Welsh minister and scholar (d. 1714)
1663 – Prince Eugene of Savoy (d. 1736)
1668 – John George IV, Elector of Saxony (d. 1694)
1701 – Charles le Beau, French historian and author (d. 1778)
1706 – Baldassare Galuppi, Italian harpsichord player and composer (d. 1785)
1741 – Pierre Choderlos de Laclos, French general and author (d. 1803)
1777 – Heinrich von Kleist, German author and poet (d. 1811)
1785 – Thomas Love Peacock, English author and poet (d. 1866)
1792 – Lucas Alamán, Mexican politician and historian (d. 1853)
1804 – Mongkut, Thai king (d. 1868)
1822 – Midhat Pasha, Ottoman civil servant and politician, 238th Grand Vizier of the Ottoman Empire (d. 1883)
1831 – Frederick III, German Emperor (d. 1888)
1836 – Frederick August Otto Schwarz, American businessman, founded FAO Schwarz (d. 1911)
1850 – Basil Hall Chamberlain, English-Swiss historian, author, and academic (d. 1935)
1854 – Billy Murdoch, Australian cricketer (d. 1911)
1859 – Henri Bergson, French philosopher and theologian, Nobel Prize laureate (d. 1941)
1862 – Mehmet Esat Bülkat, Ottoman general (d. 1952)
1865 – Arie de Jong, Dutch linguist and author (d. 1957)
  1865   – Logan Pearsall Smith, American-English author and critic (d. 1946)
1868 – Ernst Didring, Swedish author (d. 1931)
1869 – Johannes Linnankoski, Finnish author (d. 1913)
1870 – D. T. Suzuki, Japanese author and scholar (d. 1966)
1872 – Mikhail Kuzmin, Russian poet and author (d. 1936)
1873 – Ivanoe Bonomi, Italian lawyer and politician, 25th Prime Minister of Italy (d. 1951)
1875 – Len Braund, English cricketer, coach, and umpire (d. 1955)
1878 – James Truslow Adams, American historian and author (d. 1949)
1880 – Ze'ev Jabotinsky, Ukrainian-Russian general, journalist, and theorist (d. 1940)
1881 – Max Gerson, German-born American physician (d. 1959)
1882 – Lucien Petit-Breton, French cyclist (d. 1917)
1887 – Takashi Sakai, Japanese general and politician, Governor of Hong Kong (d. 1946)
1888 – Paul Vermoyal, French actor (d. 1925) 
1893 – Sidney Holland, New Zealand lieutenant and politician, 25th Prime Minister of New Zealand (d. 1961)
  1893   – George Ohsawa, Japanese philosopher and academic (d. 1966)
1894 – H. L. Davis, American author and poet (d. 1960)
  1894   – Tibor Déry, Hungarian author and translator (d. 1977)
1897 – Isabel Briggs Myers, American theorist and author (d. 1980)
1898 – Lotte Lenya, Austrian singer and actress (d. 1981)

1901–present
1902 – Miriam Hopkins, American actress (d. 1972)
  1902   – Pascual Jordan, German physicist and theorist (d. 1980)
1903 – Lina Radke, German runner and coach (d. 1983)
1904 – Aarne Juutilainen, Finnish army captain (d. 1976)
  1904   – A. J. Liebling, American journalist and author (d. 1963)
  1904   – Haim Shirman, Ukrainian-Israeli scholar and academic (d. 1981)
1905 – Jan Gies, Dutch activist (d. 1993)
  1905   – Félix Houphouët-Boigny, Ivorian union leader and politician, 1st President of Côte d'Ivoire (d. 1993)
1906 – James Brooks, American painter and educator (d. 1992)
1909 – Norberto Bobbio, Italian philosopher and theorist (d. 2004)
1914 – Raymond Lambert, Swiss mountaineer (d. 1997)
1915 – Victor Sen Yung, American actor (d. 1980)
1918 – Molly Geertsema, Dutch lawyer and politician, Deputy Prime Minister of the Netherlands (d. 1991)
  1918   – Konstantinos Mitsotakis, Greek lawyer and politician, 178th Prime Minister of Greece (d. 2017)
  1918   – Bobby Troup, American singer-songwriter, pianist, and actor (d. 1999)
1919 – Ric Nordman, Canadian captain and politician (d. 1996)
  1919   – Anita O'Day, American singer (d. 2006)
  1919   – Pierre Trudeau, Canadian lawyer, academic, and politician, 15th Prime Minister of Canada (d. 2000)
  1919   – Camilla Williams, American soprano and educator (d. 2012)
1920 – Melina Mercouri, Greek actress, singer, and politician, 9th Greek Minister of Culture (d. 1994)
1921 – Jerry Cooke, Ukrainian-American photographer and journalist (d. 2005)
  1921   – Jesse Helms, American journalist and politician (d. 2008)
  1921   – Beatrice Helen Worsley, Mexican-Canadian computer scientist and academic (d. 1972)
1923 – Jessie Mae Hemphill, American singer-songwriter and guitarist (d. 2008)
1924 – Buddy MacMaster, Canadian singer-songwriter and fiddler (d. 2014)
1925 – Ramiz Alia, Albanian politician, 1st President of Albania (d. 2011)
1926 – Chuck Berry, American singer-songwriter and guitarist (d. 2017)
  1926   – Klaus Kinski, German-American actor, director, and screenwriter (d. 1991)
1927 – Marv Rotblatt, American baseball player (d. 2013)
  1927   – George C. Scott, American actor and director (d. 1999)
1928 – Keith Jackson, American sportscaster and actor (d. 2018)
  1928   – Maurice El Mediouni, Algerian pianist and composer
  1928   – Dick Taverne, English lawyer and politician
1929 – Violeta Chamorro, Nicaraguan publisher and politician, President of Nicaragua
  1929   – Hillard Elkins, American producer and manager (d. 2010)
  1929   – Kees Fens, Dutch author and critic (d. 2008)
  1929   – Frank Stanmore, Australian rugby league player (d. 2005)
1930 – Flora Fraser, 21st Lady Saltoun, Scottish politician
  1930   – Esther Hautzig, Lithuanian-American author (d. 2009)
1931 – Chris Albertson, Icelandic-American historian, journalist, and producer (d. 2019)
  1931   – Roger Climpson, English-Australian journalist
  1931   – Ien Dales, Dutch civil servant and politician, Dutch Minister of the Interior (d. 1994)
1932 – Vytautas Landsbergis, Lithuanian musicologist and politician
1933 – Forrest Gregg, American football player and coach (d. 2019)
  1933   – Irwin M. Jacobs, American electrical engineer, businessman, and entrepreneur
  1933   – Ludovico Scarfiotti, Italian race car driver (d. 1968)
1934 – Inger Stevens, Swedish-American actress (d. 1970)
1935 – Peter Boyle, American actor (d. 2006)
1936 – Jaime Lucas Ortega y Alamino, Cuban cardinal (d. 2019)
1938 – Robert Dove, American lawyer and politician (d. 2021)
  1938   – Dawn Wells, American model and actress, Miss Nevada 1959 (d. 2020)
1939 – Flavio Cotti, Swiss lawyer and politician, 82nd President of the Swiss Confederation (d. 2020)
  1939   – Mike Ditka, American football player, coach, and sportscaster
  1939   – Lee Harvey Oswald, American assassin of John F. Kennedy (d. 1963)
  1939   – Paddy Reilly, Irish folk singer and guitarist
  1939   – Jan Erik Vold, Norwegian poet, author, and translator
1940 – Cynthia Weil, American songwriter
  1940   – Talitha Getty, actress and model of Dutch extraction (d. 1971)
1941 – Timothy Bell, Baron Bell, English businessman (d. 2019)
  1941   – Martha Burk, American psychologist and author
1942 – Gianfranco Ravasi, Italian cardinal and scholar
1943 – Christine Charbonneau, Canadian singer-songwriter (d. 2014)
  1943   – Birthe Rønn Hornbech, Danish police officer and politician, Danish Minister for Ecclesiastical Affairs
1945 – Huell Howser, American television host and actor (d. 2013)
  1945   – Chris Shays, American politician
1946 – James Robert Baker, American author and screenwriter (d. 1997)
  1946   – Frank Beamer, American football player and coach
  1946   – Dafydd Elis-Thomas, Welsh academic and politician
  1946   – Howard Shore, Canadian composer, conductor, and producer
1947 – Paul Chuckle, English comedian, actor, and screenwriter
  1947   – Job Cohen, Dutch scholar and politician, Mayor of Amsterdam
  1947   – Laura Nyro, American singer-songwriter and pianist (d. 1997)
  1947   – Gary Sullivan, Australian rugby league player
1948 – Hans Köchler, Austrian philosopher, author, and academic
  1948   – Ntozake Shange, American author, poet, and playwright (d. 2018)
1949 – Joe Egan, Scottish singer-songwriter 
  1949   – George Hendrick, American baseball player and coach
  1949   – Gary Richrath, American guitarist, songwriter, and producer (d. 2015)
1950 – Wendy Wasserstein, American playwright and author (d. 2006)
1951 – Mike Antonovich, American ice hockey player and coach
  1951   – Pam Dawber, American actress and producer
  1951   – Terry McMillan, American author and screenwriter
  1951   – David Normington, English civil servant and politician
  1951   – Nic Potter, English bass player and songwriter (d. 2013)
1952 – Roy Dias, Sri Lankan cricketer and coach
  1952   – Paul Geroski, American-English economist and academic (d. 2005)
  1952   – Chuck Lorre, American director, producer, and screenwriter
  1952   – Patrick Morrow, Canadian mountaineer and photographer
  1952   – Bảo Ninh, Vietnamese soldier and author
  1952   – Allen Ripley, American baseball player (d. 2014)
  1952   – Jerry Royster, American baseball player, coach, and manager
1954 – Nick Houghton, English general
  1954   – Arliss Howard, American actor, director, producer, and screenwriter
  1954   – Bob Weinstein, American film executive
1955 – Jean-Pierre Hautier, Belgian journalist and television host (d. 2012)
  1955   – Vanessa Briscoe Hay, American singer-songwriter and keyboard player 
  1955   – Timmy Mallett, English radio and television host
  1955   – Stu Mead, American painter and illustrator
  1955   – David Twohy, American director, producer, and screenwriter
  1955   – Rita Verdonk, Dutch journalist and politician, Dutch Minister of Justice
  1955   – Denis Watson, Zimbabwean golfer
  1955   – Mark Welland, English physicist and academic
1956 – Craig Bartlett, American animator, producer, screenwriter, and voice actor
  1956   – Martina Navratilova, Czech-American tennis player and coach
  1956   – Jim Talent, American lawyer and politician
1957 – Jon Lindstrom, American actor, director, producer, and screenwriter
  1957   – Catherine Ringer, French singer-songwriter, dancer, and actress 
1958 – Thomas Hearns, American boxer
  1958   – Megumi Ishii, Japanese actress and politician
  1958   – Letitia James, American lawyer, activist and politician
  1958   – Kjell Samuelsson, Swedish ice hockey player and coach
1959 – Kirby Chambliss, American pilot
  1959   – Mauricio Funes, Salvadoran politician, former President of El Salvador
  1959   – Milcho Manchevski, Macedonian-American director and screenwriter
  1959   – John Nord, American wrestler
1960 – Erin Moran, American actress (d. 2017)
  1960   – Jean-Claude Van Damme, Belgian martial artist, actor, and producer, and screenwriter
1961 – Wynton Marsalis, American trumpet player, composer, and educator
  1961   – Rick Moody, American author and composer
  1961   – Gladstone Small, Barbadian-English cricketer
1962 – Min Ko Naing, Burmese activist
  1962   – Vincent Spano, American actor, director, and producer
1963 – Sigvart Dagsland, Norwegian singer, pianist and composer
1964 – Dan Lilker, American singer-songwriter and bass player 
  1964   – Charles Stross, English journalist, author, and programmer
1965 – Curtis Stigers, American singer-songwriter and guitarist
  1965   – Zakir Naik, an Indian Islamic preacher; founder and president of the Islamic Research Foundation (IRF)
1966 – Dave Price, American journalist and game show host
1967 – Eric Stuart, American singer-songwriter, guitarist, and voice actor
1968 – Rhod Gilbert, Welsh comedian
  1968   – Stuart Law, Australian cricketer and coach
  1968   – Michael Stich, German tennis player and sportscaster
1969 – Volker Neumüller, German talent manager
  1969   – Nelson Vivas, Argentinian footballer, coach, and manager
1970 – Doug Mirabelli, American baseball player and coach
  1970   – Mike Starink, Dutch television host and actor
1971 – Nick O'Hern, Australian golfer
1972 – Mika Ninagawa, Japanese photographer and director
  1972   – Alex Tagliani, Canadian race car driver
1973 – Stephen Allan, Australian golfer
  1973   – James Foley, American photographer and journalist (d. 2014)
  1973   – Michalis Kapsis, Greek footballer
  1973   – Rachel Nichols, American journalist and sportscaster
  1973   – Sarah Winckless, English rower
1974 – Robbie Savage, Welsh footballer and sportscaster
  1974   – Peter Svensson, Swedish guitarist and songwriter
  1974   – Zhou Xun, Chinese actress and singer
  1974   – Amish Tripathi, Indian author 
1975 – Alex Cora, Puerto Rican-American baseball player and sportscaster
  1975   – Josh Sawyer, American video game designer
1977 – Flavia Colgan, Brazilian-American journalist
  1977   – Kunal Kapoor, Indian actor
  1977   – Ryan Nelsen, New Zealand-American soccer player and coach
  1977   – David Vuillemin, French motorcycle racer
1978 – Mike Tindall, English rugby player
  1978   – Kenji Wu, Taiwanese singer-songwriter and actor
1979 – Damon Scott, British entertainer
  1979   – Jaroslav Drobný, Czech footballer
  1979   – Ne-Yo, American singer, songwriter, record producer, dancer, and actor
1980 – Birsen Yavuz, Turkish sprinter and hurdler
1981 – Nathan Hauritz, Australian cricketer
  1981   – Tina Hergold, Slovenian tennis player
  1981   – Greg Warren, American football player
1982 – Thierry Amiel, French singer-songwriter
  1982   – Michael Dingsdag, Dutch footballer
  1982   – Mark Sampson, Welsh footballer and manager
  1982   – Simon Gotch, American wrestler
1983 – Dante, Brazilian footballer
1984 – Robert Harting, German discus thrower
  1984   – Freida Pinto, Indian actress and model
  1984   – Esperanza Spalding, American singer-songwriter and bassist
  1984   – Lindsey Vonn, American skier
  1984   – Milo Yiannopoulos, British journalist and public speaker
1985 – Yoenis Céspedes, Cuban baseball player
  1985   – Andrew Garcia, American singer-songwriter and guitarist
1986 – Wilma Elles, German actress and fashion designer
1987 – Zac Efron, American actor and singer
  1987   – Freja Beha Erichsen, Danish model
1988 – Tessa Schram, Dutch director and actress
1989 – Laci Green, American YouTube personality, video blogger, sex educator, and activist
  1989   – Riisa Naka, Japanese model and actress
1990 – Bristol Palin, American public speaker and reality television personality
  1990   – Brittney Griner, American professional basketball player
  1990   – Drew Crawford, American basketball player
1991 – Roly Bonevacia, Dutch footballer
1992 – John John Florence, American professional surfer
1993 – Ivan Cavaleiro, Portuguese professional footballer
1994 – Pascal Wehrlein, German-Mauritian Formula One driver
  1994   – Enhō Akira, Japanese sumo wrestler

Deaths

Pre-1600
AD 31 – Lucius Aelius Sejanus, Roman politician (b. 20 BC)
 325 – Emperor Ming of Jin (b. 299)
AD 707 – Pope John VII (b. 650)
 815 – Abu'l-Saraya, Zaydi rebel leader
1035 – Sancho III of Pamplona (b. 992)
1081 – Nikephoros Palaiologos, Byzantine general
1101 – Hugh I, Count of Vermandois (b. 1053)
1141 – Leopold, Duke of Bavaria (b. 1108)
1214 – John de Gray, bishop of Norwich
1366 – Petrus Torkilsson, Archbishop of Uppsala
1382 – James Butler, 2nd Earl of Ormond, Irish politician, Lord Justice of Ireland (b. 1331)
1417 – Pope Gregory XII (b. 1326)
1442 – Infante João of Portugal (b. 1400)
1480 – Uhwudong, Korean dancer and poet (b. 1440)
1503 – Pope Pius III (b. 1439)
1508 – Patrick Hepburn, 1st Earl of Bothwell, Lord High Admiral of Scotland
1511 – Philippe de Commines, French-speaking Fleming in the courts of Burgundy and France (b. 1447)
1526 – Lucas Vázquez de Ayllón, Spanish explorer (b. 1475)
1541 – Margaret Tudor, queen of James IV of Scotland (born 1489)
1545 – John Taverner, English organist and composer (b. 1490)
1558 – Mary of Hungary (b. 1505)
1561 – Yamamoto Kansuke, Japanese samurai (b. 1501)
1564 – Johannes Acronius Frisius, Dutch physician and mathematician (b. 1520)
1570 – Manuel da Nóbrega, Portuguese-Brazilian priest and missionary (b. 1517)

1601–1900
1604 – Igram van Achelen, Dutch lawyer and politician (b. 1528)
1646 – Isaac Jogues, French priest, missionary, and martyr (b. 1607)
1667 – Fasilides, Ethiopian emperor (b. 1603)
1678 – Jacob Jordaens, Belgian painter illustrator (b. 1593)
1739 – António José da Silva, Brazilian-Portuguese playwright (b. 1705)
1744 – Sarah Churchill, Duchess of Marlborough (b. 1660)
1770 – John Manners, Marquess of Granby, English general and politician, Lord Lieutenant of Derbyshire (b. 1721)
1775 – Christian August Crusius, German philosopher and theologian (b. 1715)
1817 – Etienne Nicolas Méhul, French pianist and composer (b. 1763)
1865 – Henry John Temple, 3rd Viscount Palmerston, English soldier and politician, Prime Minister of the United Kingdom (b. 1784)
1871 – Charles Babbage, English mathematician and engineer, invented the mechanical computer (b. 1791)
1876 – Francis Preston Blair, American journalist (b. 1791)
1886 – Philipp Franz von Siebold, German physician and botanist (b. 1796)
1889 – Antonio Meucci, Italian-American engineer (b. 1808)
1892 – William W. Chapman, American lawyer and politician (b. 1808)
1893 – Charles Gounod, French composer and educator (b. 1818)

1901–present
1908 – Nozu Michitsura, Japanese field marshal (b. 1840)
1911 – Alfred Binet, French psychologist and author (b. 1857)
1921 – Ludwig III of Bavaria (b. 1845)
1931 – Thomas Edison, American engineer and businessman, invented the light bulb and phonograph (b. 1847)
1934 – Santiago Ramón y Cajal, Spanish pathologist, histologist, and neuroscientist, Nobel Prize laureate (b. 1852)
1935 – Gaston Lachaise, French-American sculptor (b. 1882)
1941 – Manuel Teixeira Gomes, Portuguese lawyer and politician, 7th President of Portugal (b. 1860)
1942 – Mikhail Nesterov, Russian painter (b. 1862)
1947 – Michiaki Kamada, Japanese admiral (b. 1890)
1948 – Walther von Brauchitsch, German field marshal (b. 1881)
1956 – Yoshio Markino, Japanese painter and author (b. 1869)
1959 – Boughera El Ouafi, Algerian-French runner (b. 1898)
1961 – Tsuru Aoki, Japanese-American actress (b. 1892)
1962 – Iván Petrovich, Serbian-German actor and singer (b. 1894)
1965 – Henry Travers, Irish-American actor (b. 1874)
1966 – Elizabeth Arden, Canadian-American businesswoman, founded Elizabeth Arden, Inc. (b. 1878)
  1966   – S. S. Kresge, American businessman, founded Kmart (b. 1867)
1969 – Gyula Mándi, Hungarian footballer and manager (b. 1899)
1973 – Margaret Caroline Anderson, American publisher, founded The Little Review (b. 1886)
  1973   – Walt Kelly, American illustrator and animator (b. 1913)
  1973   – Leo Strauss, German-American political scientist, philosopher, and academic (b. 1899)
1975 – K. C. Douglas, American rural blues singer (b. 1913)
  1975   – Al Lettieri, American actor (b. 1928)
  1975   – Graham Haberfield, English actor (b. 1941)
1976 – Viswanatha Satyanarayana, Indian poet and author (b. 1895)
1977 – Andreas Baader, German militant (b. 1943)
  1977   – Gudrun Ensslin, German militant leader, founded the Red Army Faction (b. 1940)
1978 – Ramón Mercader, Spanish journalist, assassin of Leon Trotsky (b. 1914)
1980 – Edwin Way Teale, American photographer and author (b. 1899)
1982 – Dwain Esper, American director and producer (b. 1892)
  1982   – Pierre Mendès France, French lawyer and politician, 143rd Prime Minister of France (b. 1907)
  1982   – John Robarts, Canadian lawyer and politician, 17th Premier of Ontario (b. 1917)
  1982   – Bess Truman, American wife of Harry S. Truman, 40th First Lady of the United States (b. 1885)
1983 – Diego Abad de Santillán, Spanish economist and author (b. 1897)
  1983   – Willie Jones, American baseball player (b. 1925)
1984 – Henri Michaux, French painter and poet (b. 1899)
1987 – Adriaan Ditvoorst, Dutch director and screenwriter (b. 1940)
2000 – Julie London, American singer and actress (b. 1926)
  2000   – Gwen Verdon, American actress and dancer (b. 1925)
2003 – Preston Smith, American businessman and politician, 40th Governor of Texas (b. 1912)
  2003   – Manuel Vázquez Montalbán, Spanish journalist, author, and critic (b. 1939)
2005 – Johnny Haynes, English-Scottish footballer (b. 1934)
  2005   – Bill King, American sportscaster (b. 1927)
2006 – Mario Francesco Pompedda, Italian cardinal (b. 1929)
  2006   – Anna Russell, English-Canadian singer and actress (b. 1911)
  2006   – Laurie Taitt, Guyanese-English hurdler (b. 1934)
2007 – Alan Coren, English journalist and author (b. 1938)
  2007   – William J. Crowe, American admiral and diplomat, United States Ambassador to the United Kingdom (b. 1925)
  2007   – Vincent DeDomenico, American businessman, founded the Napa Valley Wine Train (b. 1915)
  2007   – Lucky Dube, South African singer-songwriter and keyboard player (b. 1964)
2008 – Dee Dee Warwick, American singer (b. 1945)
2009 – Adriaan Kortlandt, Dutch ethologist and biologist (b. 1918)
  2009   – Nancy Spero, American painter and academic (b. 1926)
2010 – Marion Brown, American saxophonist and musicologist (b. 1931)
  2010   – Billy Raimondi, American baseball player (b. 1912)
2012 – Brain Damage, American wrestler (b. 1977)
  2012   – Sylvia Kristel, Dutch model and actress (b. 1952)
  2012   – Slater Martin, American basketball player and coach (b. 1925)
  2012   – George Mattos, American pole vaulter (b. 1929)
  2012   – Albert Lee Ueltschi, American pilot and businessman, founded FlightSafety International (b. 1917)
  2012   – David S. Ware, American saxophonist and composer (b. 1949)
2013 – Tom Foley, American lawyer and politician, 57th Speaker of the United States House of Representatives (b. 1929)
  2013   – Bum Phillips, American football player and coach (b. 1923)
  2013   – Allan Stanley, Canadian ice hockey player and coach (b. 1926)
  2013   – Bill Young, American sergeant and politician (b. 1930)
2014 – Mariano Lebrón Saviñón, Dominican author and academic (b. 1922)
  2014   – Edward Regan, American academic and politician (b. 1930)
  2014   – Sidney Shapiro, American-Chinese author and translator (b. 1915)
2015 – Robert Dickerson, Australian painter (b. 1924)
  2015   – Gamal El-Ghitani, Egyptian journalist and author (b. 1945)
  2015   – Robert W. Farquhar, American engineer (b. 1932)
  2015   – Frank Watkins, American bass player (b. 1968)
  2015   – Paul West, English-American author, poet, and academic (b. 1930)
2017 – Marino Perani, Italian football player and manager (b. 1939)
2018 – Lisbeth Palme, Swedish child psychologist, former chairwoman of UNICEF (b. 1931)
  2018   – Abdel Rahman Swar al-Dahab, 5th President of the Sudan (b. 1934)
2019 – Rui Jordão, Angolan-born Portuguese footballer (b. 1952)
2020 – René Felber, 81st President of the Swiss Confederation (b. 1933)
2021 – Colin Powell, American military leader and statesman, 65th Secretary of State (b. 1937)
2022 – Harvey Wollman, American politician, 26th Governor of South Dakota (b. 1935)

Holidays and observances
Alaska Day (Alaska, United States)
Christian feast day:
Justus of Beauvais
Luke the Evangelist
Peter of Alcantara, can also be celebrated on October 19. 
October 18 (Eastern Orthodox liturgics)
Independence Day (Azerbaijan), celebrates the independence of Azerbaijan from the Soviet Union in 1991.
Necktie Day (Croatia)
Persons Day (Canada)
World Menopause Day

References

External links

 
 
 

Days of the year
October